Government Higher Secondary School Alampady (G.H.S.S Alampady), Kasaragod, Kerala, India, is a co-educational Malayalam medium school. The school is situated at upper part of Alampady about one kilometer away from Alampady town. The school is managed by Kerala State Education Board following the SCERT syllabus and official school code is 11022. 
 
The school consists of grades from 1 to 12 with a pre-primary section and in the higher secondary section, there are commerce and humanities batches. The school is in its own 2 acres of land, which includes 33 classrooms, 3 labs, 2 libraries, 4 toilets, and 2 rooms for non-teaching activities. The staff strength of the school is 35, in which 32 are teaching staff and 4 are non-teaching staff.

History
G.H.S.S Alampady was established in 1975 by Kerala Government as a lower primary school. This was the only school near to Alampady at the time of establishment. The school started and continued its operations in Madrasa, which was run by Qilar Juma Masjid committee, Alampady until the school got its own building.

References
List of educational institutions in Kasaragod district
List of school in Kasaragod District 2018 
List of schools in Kasaragod 
G.H.S.S Alampady

High schools and secondary schools in Kerala
Schools in Kasaragod district
Educational institutions established in 1943
1943 establishments in India